Old Friends and New Fancies: An Imaginary Sequel to the Novels of Jane Austen (1913) is a novel by Sybil G. Brinton that is often acknowledged to be the first sequel to the works of Jane Austen and as such is possibly the first piece of published Austen fan fiction, although earlier examples have been described by Sarah Glosson. It incorporates characters from each of Austen's six major novels into one unified story, alongside characters of Brinton's own invention. Keeping to the spirit of the source novels, its major theme is the difficulties faced by assorted pairs of lovers placed within the class structure of early 19th century Britain.

Plot
Old Friends and New Fancies is set in the same time as Austen's own novels and is similarly structured, with a focus on the challenges of matchmaking among pairs of lovers kept apart by various social and economic tensions. It has something of a postmodern overtone in that it mixes together characters from all six of Austen's major novels, creating an enormously extended network of friends, relations, and acquaintances. For example, Elizabeth (Bennet) Darcy (of Pride and Prejudice), Elinor (Dashwood) Ferrars (of Sense and Sensibility), and Anne (Elliot) Wentworth (of Persuasion) are all friends. Despite the fact that Brinton provides a full list of characters (sorted by their source books), keeping the cast straight is something many readers complain about, since quite a few of the characters are only mentioned in passing. Most of the characters are recognizably the same, though several have improved—among them Kitty Bennet and Tom Bertram—while George Knightley is somewhat sourer and Mary Crawford much less lively than in Austen's depictions. The largest single change from Austen's own books is that Marianne Dashwood's husband, Colonel Brandon, has died before the book opens. Although the book jacket proclaims that Brinton mixes in "new characters of the author's devising," none of the new characters are of any great importance. Because many of the key characters hail from Pride and Prejudice, some critics treat Old Friends and New Fancies primarily as a sequel to that particular book. Mansfield Park is the next best represented novel in terms of major characters.

The chief protagonists of Old Friends and New Fancies are three young women, all unmarried at the outset: Georgiana Darcy and Kitty Bennet (Pride and Prejudice) and Mary Crawford (Mansfield Park). The novel begins after the marriage of Elizabeth Bennet and Fitzwilliam Darcy (they have two children, a boy of two years, and a baby girl); Darcy's sister Georgiana and cousin Colonel Fitzwilliam have been engaged for six months but are not very happy together, and they soon break it off. Col. Fitzwilliam goes to visit Lady Catherine de Bourgh in Bath with the Darcys, where he meets and falls in love with Mary Crawford. Robert and Lucy (Steele) Ferrars have been cultivating Lady Catherine, and Lucy is hoping that Col. Fitzwilliam will marry her sister Anne. The Ferrars take the opportunity to slander Mary to Lady Catherine, resulting in her banishment from Lady Catherine's circle. Lonely and defiant, Mary begins spending time with an admiring Sir Walter Elliott, leading to a rumor that they are about to marry. Hearing this and feeling that his comparative poverty and lack of title make him a poor match for Mary, Col. Fitzwilliam removes himself from the scene, going to Ireland for a time. They are only reconciled after Col. Fitzwilliam is badly injured in a fall from his horse while hunting.

Meanwhile, Kitty Bennet has gone to London as a protégé of Emma (Woodhouse) Knightley. Although less flighty than formerly, she falls madly in love with William Price, a friend of the Knightleys and a naval officer who is the younger brother of Fanny (Price) Bertram of Mansfield Park. Georgiana visits Kitty in London, where she is introduced to William at a ball given by the Knightleys. Kitty later goes to stay with Elizabeth and Georgiana at Pemberley, and they try unsuccessfully to rein in her expectation of receiving a proposal of marriage from William. The Darcys give a ball at which William, instead of proposing to Kitty, declares his love to Georgiana. Georgiana, out of consideration for Kitty's feelings and confusion about her own, initially rebuffs William, but eventually the two become engaged, while a sobered Kitty pairs up with clergyman James Morland, whom Darcy has installed in a local parish. The latter denouement was hinted at by Austen herself in her letters, where she mentions that she can imagine Kitty married to a Derbyshire clergyman. Almost as an afterthought, Brinton also pairs up Tom Bertram and Isabella Thorpe, completing a sequence in which all of Brinton's characters destined for matrimony become engaged to someone from a different Jane Austen novel.

Source novels of key characters
Pride and Prejudice: Kitty Bennet, Elizabeth Bennet (here Elizabeth Darcy), Fitzwilliam Darcy,  Georgiana Darcy, Colonel Fitzwilliam, Lady Catherine de Bourgh
Mansfield Park: Mary Crawford, William Price, Tom Bertram
Sense and Sensibility: Elinor Dashwood (here Elinor Ferrars), Robert Ferrars, Lucy Steele (here Lucy Ferrars), Anne Steele
Emma: Emma Woodhouse (here Emma Knightley), George Knightley
Persuasion: Anne Elliot (here Anne Wentworth), Sir Walter Elliott
Northanger Abbey: Isabella Thorpe, James Morland

Author and style
Very little is known about Sybil Grace Brinton. She was born in 1874 at Stourport-on-Severn in Worcestershire and was subject to ill health throughout her life. She married in 1908 and died in 1928. What she termed her "little attempt at picturing the after-adventures of some of Jane Austen's characters" was her only book. Only a few editions were published, and it remained relatively unknown until it was reprinted in 1998, after it had passed into the public domain. Brinton states in her preface that she used a memoir by Jane Austen's nephew James Austen-Leigh as one source for her plot elements.

Some critics find Brinton's style flat and the novel cluttered by minor characters; on the whole, it is considered less successful than later Austen sequels. While Brinton's style is certainly less sharply satirical than Austen's, it is still recognizably Austenian in spirit and tone:

Brinton sometimes slips into anachronism, for example using the adjective 'nice' in ways it was not employed in Austen's time. Brinton makes less use than Austen of dialogue generally, especially banter, but spends more time reflecting on her characters' inner lives and motivations. Some of the plot elements feel recycled from Austen's work—for example, an episode of charades at Pemberley (instead of Mansfield Park), the severe tongue-lashing Lady Catherine administers to Mary Crawford (instead of Elizabeth Bennett), or the illness of Kitty (instead of Marianne Dashwood) precipitated by unrequited love. While these may be deliberate homages to Austen, they can come off as a lack of inventiveness on Brinton's part.

While Old Friends and New Fancies is now considered the first sequel to Jane Austen's works, there are a few prior books with a claim to the title, including an 1815 French translation of Sense and Sensibility by Isabelle de Montolieu that changed the ending; and an 1850 transformation of Austen's unfinished novel The Watsons into The Younger Sister by Austen's own niece, Catherine Anne Hubback. As reworkings of existing manuscripts, these have a much weaker claim than Brinton's book, in which the plot is entirely her own even though nearly all the characters are borrowed.

References

External links
Project Gutenberg etext of the novel
 

1913 British novels
British romance novels
Novels based on Pride and Prejudice
Fan fiction works